Every Day I Have the Blues is an album by blues/jazz vocalist Jimmy Rushing with an orchestra arranged and conducted by Oliver Nelson released by the BluesWay label in 1967.

Reception

AllMusic reviewer Scott Yanow stated: "It may have been relatively late in Jimmy Rushing's career ... but he was still in prime singing voice. Joined by such friends as trombonist Dickie Wells, trumpeter Clark Terry, and tenor saxophonist Buddy Tate, Rushing shows that he was still relevant ... both Rushing and the musicians play off each other well, resulting in a swinging set".

Track listing
 "Berkeley Campus Blues" (Bob Thiele, George David Weiss) – 3:06
 "Keep the Faith, Baby" (Shirley Scott, George Ismay, Rick Ward) – 2:48
 "You Can't Run Around" (Count Basie, Jimmy Rushing) – 4:04
 "Blues in the Dark" (Basie, Rushing) – 3:45
 "Baby, Don't Tell on Me" (Basie, Rushing, Lester Young) – 2:44
 "Every Day I Have the Blues" (Peter Chatman) – 2:52
 "I Left My Baby" (Basie, Rushing, Andy Gibson) – 4:28
 "Undecided Blues" (Rushing) – 5:18
 "Evil Blues" (Basie, Rushing, Harry Edison) – 2:58

Personnel
Jimmy Rushing – vocals
Clark Terry – trumpet
Dickie Wells – trombone
Bob Ashton – tenor saxophone
Hank Jones – piano, organ (tracks (1-8)
Shirley Scott – organ (track 9)
Kenny Burrell – guitar (track 9)
George Duvivier – bass
Grady Tate – drums
Other unidentified musicians
Oliver Nelson – arranger, conductor

References

Jimmy Rushing albums
1967 albums
BluesWay Records albums
Albums produced by Bob Thiele
Albums arranged by Oliver Nelson
Albums conducted by Oliver Nelson